Mothers Against Drunk Driving (MADD) is a non-profit organization in the United States, Canada and Brazil that seeks to stop drunk driving, support those affected by drunk driving, prevent underage drinking, and strive for stricter impaired driving policy, whether that impairment is caused by alcohol or any other drug. The Irving, Texas–based organization was founded on September 5, 1980, in California by Candace Lightner after her 13-year-old daughter, Cari, was killed by a drunk driver. There is at least one MADD office in every state of the United States and at least one in each province of Canada. These offices offer victim services and many resources involving alcohol safety. MADD has claimed that drunk driving has been reduced by half since its founding.

Positions
According to MADD's website, "The mission of Mothers Against Drunk Driving is to end drunk driving, help fight drugged driving, support the victims of these violent crimes and prevent underage drinking." Generally MADD favors strict policy in a variety of areas, including an illegal blood alcohol content of .08% or lower and using stronger sanctions for DUI offenders, including mandatory jail sentences, treatment for alcoholism and other alcohol abuse issues, ignition interlock devices, and license suspensions; maintaining the minimum legal drinking age at 21 years; mandating alcohol breath-testing ignition interlock devices (IIDs) for everyone convicted of driving while legally impaired.

MADD's founder Candace Lightner left the group in 1985. In the same year, Stevie Wonder added the song "Don’t Drive Drunk" on the Woman in Red movie soundtrack that referenced MADD and summarized its policy positions.

In 2002, as reported by The Washington Times, Lightner stated that MADD "has become far more neo-prohibitionist than I had ever wanted or envisioned … I didn't start MADD to deal with alcohol. I started MADD to deal with the issue of drunk driving".

Author Susan Cheever and the SAGE Encyclopedia of Social Problems have said MADD is a manifestation of the temperance movement. MADD "supports a substantial increase in taxation on alcoholic beverages as a means of covering the cost to society caused by misuse of alcohol". MADD "advocates that schools and other organizations hosting social and athletic gatherings for youth take positive steps to ensure that alcoholic beverages not be present at those gatherings".

History
On May 3, 1980, Cari Lightner, a 13-year-old girl, was killed by a drunken hit-and-run driver at Sunset and New York Avenues in Fair Oaks, California. The 46-year-old driver, who had recently been arrested for another DUI hit-and-run, left Cari's body at the scene. Cari's mother, Candace (Candy) Lightner, organized Mothers Against Drunk Driving and subsequently served as its founding president. A 1983 television movie about Lightner garnered publicity for the group, which grew rapidly.

In the early 1980s, the group attracted the attention of the United States Congress. Senator Frank Lautenberg (D-NJ) did not like the fact that youth in New Jersey could easily travel to New York to purchase alcoholic beverages, circumventing New Jersey's law restricting consumption to those 21 years old and older.

The group had its greatest success with the enacting of a 1984 federal law, the National Minimum Drinking Age Act, that introduced a federal penalty (a 5%—later raised to 10%—loss of federal highway dollars), for states that did not raise the minimum legal age for the purchase and possession of alcohol to 21. After the United States Supreme Court upheld the law in the 1987 case of South Dakota v. Dole, every state and the District of Columbia made the necessary adjustments by 1988 (but not the territories of Puerto Rico and Guam). However, in July 2010 Guam raised its drinking age to 21.

In 1985, Lightner objected to the shifting focus of MADD, and left her position with the organization.

In 1988, a drunk driver traveling the wrong way on Interstate 71 in Kentucky caused a head-on collision with a school bus. Twenty-seven people died and dozens more were injured in the ensuing fire. Known as the Carrollton bus disaster, it equaled another bus crash in Kentucky in 1958 as the deadliest bus crash in US history. In the aftermath, several parents of the victims became actively involved in MADD and one became its national president.

In 1990, MADD Canada was founded with Toronto activist John Bates as chair.

In 1994, The Chronicle of Philanthropy released the results of the largest study of charitable and non-profit organization popularity and credibility.  The study showed that MADD was ranked as the "most popular charity/non-profit in America of over 100 charities researched with 51% of Americans over the age of 12 choosing 'Love' and 'Like A Lot' for MADD".

MADD released its first "Rating the States" report, grading the states in their progress against drunk driving, in 1991. "Rating the States" has been released four times since then.

In 1999, MADD's National Board of Directors unanimously voted to change the organization's mission statement to include the prevention of underage drinking.

In 2002, MADD announced its "Eight-Point Plan". This consisted of:
 Resuscitating the nation's efforts to prevent impaired driving.
 Increasing driving while intoxicated (DWI)/driving under the influence (DUI) enforcement, especially the use of frequent, highly publicized sobriety checkpoints.
 Enacting primary enforcement seat belt laws in all states.
 Creating tougher, more comprehensive sanctions geared toward higher-risk drivers.
 Developing a dedicated National Traffic Safety Fund.
 Reducing underage drinking.
 Increasing beer excise taxes to the same level as those for spirits.
 Reinvigorating court monitoring programs.

In a November 2006 press release, MADD launched its 'Campaign to Eliminate Drunk Driving': this is a four-point plan to eliminate drunk driving in the United States using a combination of current technology (such as alcohol ignition interlock devices), new technology in smart cars, law enforcement, and grass roots activism.

MADD's national president was Millie I. Webb in 2002. Chuck Hurley became MADD CEO in 2005. He retired in June 2010 and was replaced by Kimberly Earle, who had been CEO of Susan G. Komen for the Cure since 2007. Earle left to become the president of a new foundation of Sanford Health in January 2012, the Edith Sanford Breast Cancer Foundation. Debbie Weir replaced her as MADD's CEO.

In 2019, MADD Brazil was founded.

Funding
According to Obama-Coburn Federal Funding Accountability Transparency Act of 2006, MADD received $56,814 in funds from the federal government in fiscal year 2000, and a total of $9,593,455 between fiscal years 2001 and 2006.

In 1994, Money magazine reported that telemarketers raised over $38 million for MADD, keeping nearly half of it in fees. This relationship continues to date.

In 2001, Worth magazine listed MADD as one of its "100 best charities".

In 2005, USA Today reported that the American Institute of Philanthropy was reducing MADD from a "C" to a "D" in its ratings. The Institute noted that MADD categorizes much of its fundraising expenses as "educational expenses", and that up to 58% of its revenue was expended on what the Institute considered fundraising and management.

Charity Navigator rated MADD at 63.53 out of 100 on its financial rating scale and 96.00 out of 100 on its accountability and transparency scale for its 2013 fiscal year. MADD reported that it spent 24.4% of its total expenses on fundraising that year.

In 2014, MADD spent over $9 million on fundraising activities according to its 2014 tax return.

Activities and criticisms

Radley Balko, an advocate for decriminalizing drunk driving, argued in a December 2002 article that MADD's policies were becoming overbearing. "In fairness, MADD deserves credit for raising awareness of the dangers of driving while intoxicated. It was almost certainly MADD's dogged efforts to spark public debate that effected the drop in fatalities since 1980, when Candy Lightner founded the group after her daughter was killed by a drunk driver," Balko wrote. "But MADD is at heart a bureaucracy, a big one. It boasts an annual budget of $45 million, $12 million of which pays for salaries, pensions and benefits. Bureaucracies don't change easily, even when the problems they were created to address change." Charity Watch gives MADD a "C−" grade.

Drunk driving laws
MADD was heavily involved in lobbying to reduce the legal limit for blood alcohol from BAC .10 to BAC .08. In 2000, this standard was passed by Congress and by 2004, every state had a legal .08 BAC limit. MADD Canada has called for a maximum legal BAC of .05.  Although many MADD leaders have supported a lower limit, MADD has not called for a legal limit of .05 in the United States.

Victim impact panels
MADD promotes the use of victim impact panels (VIPs), in which judges require DWI offenders to hear victims or relatives of victims of drunk driving crashes relate their experiences.  MADD received $5,547,693 in 2010 from VIPs; much of this income was voluntary donations by those attending as some states do not allow a fee to be charged to offenders for non-legislative programs. Other states like California and Georgia require that a fee be paid in order to attend.  In California, this fee ranges from $25 to $50 depending on the county and in Georgia this fee is $50. Some states in the United States, such as Massachusetts, permit victims of all crimes, including drunk driving accidents, to give victim impact statements prior to sentencing so that judges and prosecutors can consider the impact on victims in deciding on an appropriate sentence to recommend or impose. The presentations are often emotional, detailed, and graphic, and focus on the tragic negative consequences of DWI and alcohol-related crashes. According to the John Howard Society, some studies have shown that permitting victims to make statements and to give testimony is psychologically beneficial to them and aids in their recovery and in their satisfaction with the criminal justice system. A New Mexico study suggested that the VIPs tended to be perceived as confrontational by multiple offenders. Such offenders then had a higher incidence of future offenses.

Grand Theft Auto
On April 29, 2008, MADD issued a press release criticizing the video game Grand Theft Auto IV saying it was "extremely disappointed" with the manufacturers. MADD has called on the ESRB to re-rate the game to Adults Only. They also called on the manufacturer (Rockstar) "to consider a stop in distribution – if not out of responsibility to society then out of respect for the millions of victims/survivors of drunk driving." Players can drive drunk in Grand Theft Auto IV but doing so makes it harder to drive. The game also explicitly recommends that the player take a taxi instead of driving, and the character makes humorous remarks suggesting that it is bad to drive drunk. Ignoring these will lead to consequences: if any police officer is around while the player is drunk driving, the player immediately becomes wanted by the police.

Blood alcohol content
Prior to MADD's influence, drunk driving laws addressed the danger by making it a criminal offense to drive a vehicle while impaired — that is, while "under the influence of alcohol"; the amount of alcohol in the body was evidence of that impairment.  The level specified at that time — commonly, 0.15% — was high enough to indicate drunkenness rather than impairment.  In part due to MADD's influence, all 50 states have now passed laws making it a criminal offense to drive with a designated level of alcohol of .08% or higher.

Sobriety checkpoints

MADD writes that "opponents of sobriety checkpoints tend to be those who drink and drive frequently and are concerned about being caught".

Radley Balko, opponent of limits on drunk driving and writer for Reason Magazine, discusses the possible social implications of some of MADD's policies in a 2002 article. He writes, "In its eight-point plan to 'jump-start the stalled war on drunk driving,' MADD advocates the use of highly publicized but random roadblocks to find drivers who have been drinking."

Beer taxes
Balko criticizes MADD for not advocating higher excise taxes on distilled spirits, even though it campaigns for higher excise taxes for beer. He writes, "Interestingly, MADD refrains from calling for an added tax on distilled spirits, an industry that the organization has partnered with on various drunk driving awareness projects." MADD writes, "Currently, the federal excise tax is $.05 per can of beer, $.04 for a glass of wine and $.12 for a shot of distilled spirits, which all contain about the same amount of alcohol." Point 7 of MADD's 8-Point Plan is to "Increase beer excise taxes to equal the current excise tax on distilled spirits".

Breath alcohol ignition interlock devices 

Additionally, MADD has proposed that breath alcohol ignition interlock devices should be installed in all new cars. Tom Incantalupo wrote: "Ultimately, the group said yesterday, it wants so-called alcohol interlock devices factory-installed in all new cars. "The main reason why people continue to drive drunk today is because they can," MADD president Glynn Birch said at a news teleconference from Washington, D.C."

Sarah Longwell, a spokeswoman for the restaurant lobbying group American Beverage Institute, responded to MADD's proposals for ignition interlocks by stating "This interlock campaign is not about eliminating drunk driving, it is about eliminating all moderate drinking prior to driving. The 40 million Americans who drink and drive responsibly should be outraged." She also points out that "Many states have laws that set the presumptive level of intoxication at .05% and you can't adjust your interlock depending on which state you're driving in. Moreover, once you factor in liability issues and sharing vehicles with underage drivers you have pushed the preset limit down to about .02%. It will be a de facto zero tolerance policy."

A review by the California Department of Motor Vehicles concluded that "interlock works for some offenders in some contexts, but not for all offenders in all situations. More specifically, ignition interlock devices work best when they are installed, although there is also some evidence that judicial orders to install an interlock are effective for repeat DUI offenders, even when not all offenders comply and install a device. California's administrative program, where repeat DUI offenders install an interlock device in order to obtain restricted driving privileges, is also associated with reductions in subsequent DUI incidents. One group for whom ignition interlock orders do not appear effective is first DUI offenders with high blood alcohol levels."

See also
 Alcohol-related traffic crashes in the United States
 Amethyst Initiative
 Choose Responsibility
 Driving under the influence
 Drunk driving in the United States
 Foundation for Advancing Alcohol Responsibility
 Reduce Impaired Driving Everywhere
 Woman's Christian Temperance Union

References

Driving under the influence
Non-profit organizations based in Texas
Victims' rights organizations
Organizations established in 1980
Alcohol law in the United States
Political advocacy groups in the United States
Temperance organizations in the United States
1980 establishments in California
Organizations based in Irving, Texas